Wolfarth is a surname. Notable people with the surname include:

Christian Wolfarth (born 1960), Swiss jazz percussion player
William M. Wolfarth (1906–1993), American politician

See also 
 Wohlfahrt